might refer to:

 Sarbi, the Australian explosives detection dog
 Sarbi, a village in Iran
 Särbi, contemporary reconstruction of the authentic name for Xianbei
Sârbi, a number of places in Romania

See also 
Sarby